"Daylight Fading" is a single by the American rock band Counting Crows.  It is the third single and also the third track of their second album Recovering the Satellites (1996). This song, along with previous releases such as "Mr. Jones" and "A Long December," had video rotation on MTV and VH1.

The single peaked at No. 26 on the U.S. Alternative Songs chart.

Track listing
 "Daylight Fading" - 3:50
 "Rain King" (Live)
 "Daylight Fading" (Live)

Charts

References

1996 songs
1997 singles
Counting Crows songs
DGC Records singles
Geffen Records singles
Song recordings produced by Gil Norton
Songs written by Adam Duritz
Songs written by Charlie Gillingham
Songs written by Dan Vickrey
Songs written by David Bryson